Laura Sullivan may refer to:

 Laura Sullivan (born 1974), American Investigative reporter
 Laura Sullivan (composer), American composer, pianist
Laura Sullivan, character in Dancouga – Super Beast Machine God